Viale is a comune (municipality) in the Province of Asti in the Italian region Piedmont, located about  east of Turin and about  northwest of Asti.

Viale borders the following municipalities: Cortanze, Cortazzone, Montafia, Piea, and Soglio.

Demographic evolution

References

Cities and towns in Piedmont